Cyriack Garel (born 13 July 1996) is a French footballer who plays as a goalkeeper for Championnat National 3 club FC Guichen.

Club career 
Garel is a youth exponent from Stade de Reims. He made his Ligue 1 debut in a 3–0 away defeat against FC Metz on 27 September 2014.

References 

1996 births
Living people
French footballers
Association football goalkeepers
Ligue 1 players
Championnat National players
Championnat National 2 players
Championnat National 3 players
Stade de Reims players
US Avranches players
US Granville players